Husain Al-Khodari  is a Kuwait football defender who played for Kuwait in the 1992 Summer Olympics. He also played for Al-Salmiya SC

External links
Sports-Reference.com Profile

1972 births
Living people
Kuwaiti footballers
Kuwait international footballers
Footballers at the 1992 Summer Olympics
Olympic footballers of Kuwait
Asian Games medalists in football
Footballers at the 1998 Asian Games
Al Salmiya SC players
Asian Games silver medalists for Kuwait
Association football defenders
Medalists at the 1998 Asian Games
Kuwait Premier League players